The Railway Company of the Congo (or CCFC) was a narrow gauge railway company in the Congo, which built and operated the Matadi–Kinshasa Railway initially with a gauge of .

History 

The Compagnie du Chemin de Fer du Congo (CCFC) was founded on 31 July 1887, on the same day the Compagnie du Congo pour le Commerce et l'Industrie (CCCI) was founded. The construction of the railway was directed by Albert Thys, whose name was given to one of the railway stations, Thysville (now Mbanza-Ngungu).

The completion of the Matadi–Kinshasa railway, in 1898, provided an alternative route around the rapids and sparked the rapid development of Léopoldville. Its construction cost the lives of 1,932 people (1,800 locals and 132 immigrants).  The living conditions in the construction of this railway were miserable. The sanitary and medical facilities were insufficient. In 1892, about two thousand people worked on the railroad, of which an average of one hundred and fifty workers per month lost their lives due to smallpox, dysentery, beriberi and exhaustion. By the end of 1892, 7,000 workers had already been recruited, 3,500 of whom had died or fled (for example, to neighboring forests). These conditions made it more difficult to recruit workers. Thys therefore attracted people from Barbados and China in September and November 1892 respectively. The Barbadians refused to leave the boats in the port of Matadi until they were forced by firearms. Seven people lost their lives in this action.

The main challenge was to build the railway track through the gorges of the Congo River, onwards through the M'pozo River, and a difficult passage along the Monts de Cristal.

Gauges  

Modifications were made from 1923 to 1931, when it was converted to  gauge on a new alignment. Several tens of thousands of workers, mostly convicts and forced labor, were employed for this renovation. 7,000 of them lost their lives in the process.

In spite of the technical and financial difficulties related to the construction of the railway line, it quickly proved to be profitable, mainly thanks to the transportation of ivory and rubber. As a  gauge railway it operated a large fleet of 0-6-0T, 0-6-2T, 2-6-2T steam locomotives before turning to 32 0-6-0+0-6-0 Garratts, and finally 5 outside-framed 2-8-2 locomotives.

Rolling stock 
Locomotives (765mm gauge)
N°111, Garratt 0-6-0+0-6-0, livery of the Société de Saint-Léonard in Liège, 1913 (N°1744/1913)
N°112-123, Garratt 0-6-0+0-6-0, livery of the Saint-Léonard à Liège, 1920-21 (N°1901-1902/1920)
N°125-132, Garratt 0-6-0+0-6-0, livery of the Saint-Léonard à Liège, 1924 (N°2001-2009/1924)
N°132-142, Garratt 0-6-0+0-6-0, livery of the Saint-Léonard à Liège, 1925 (N°2040-49/1925)

The railway in literature  

Joseph Conrad witnessed the hard labour on the railway line, when he worked in the Congo Free State, and subsequently mentioned this in his well-known novel Heart of Darkness.

References

External links
 

Railway companies of the Democratic Republic of the Congo
Railway companies of the Belgian Congo